Leptothyrsa is a genus of flowering plants belonging to the family Rutaceae.

Its native range is Southern Tropical America.

Species:
 Leptothyrsa sprucei Benth. & Hook.f.

References

Zanthoxyloideae
Zanthoxyloideae genera